Yuri Collins (born March 7, 2001) is an American college basketball player for the Saint Louis Billikens of the Atlantic 10 Conference (A-10).

High school career
Collins attended St. Mary's High School. As a senior, he averaged 22.6 points, 5.4 rebounds and 7.6 assists per game. Collins led St. Mary's to the Class 4 state championship game, averaging over 30 points per game during the team's postseason run. He committed to play college basketball at  Saint Louis over offers from DePaul, Iowa, Missouri, Missouri State and SMU.

College career
As a freshman, he averaged 5.4 points and 5.5 assists per game, leading all freshmen in assists. Collins averaged 5.1 points, 2.8 rebounds, and 6.1 assists per game as a sophomore. He took on a leadership role for the Billikens as a junior due to an ACL tear suffered by Javonte Perkins. Collins was named to the First Team All-Atlantic 10 as well as the All-Defensive Team. He averaged 11.1 points, 4.1 rebounds and 7.9 assists per game, leading NCAA Division I in assists. Following the season, he entered the 2022 NBA draft and the transfer portal. Collins ultimately withdrew from the draft and returned to Saint Louis. On November 30, 2022, he recorded 20 assists in a win over Tennessee State, setting a school record and tying for the fourth-most in a single game in Division I history.

Personal life
Collins has polydactyly, meaning he was born with an extra finger on his right hand though he had it removed.

See also
 List of NCAA Division I men's basketball players with 20 or more assists in a game
 List of NCAA Division I men's basketball season assists leaders
 List of NCAA Division I men's basketball career assists leaders

References

External links
Saint Louis Billikens bio

2001 births
Living people
American men's basketball players
Basketball players from St. Louis
Point guards
Saint Louis Billikens men's basketball players